Domvile baronets may refer to:
 Domvile baronets (1686 creation) two baronets, extinct 1768
 Domvile baronets (1815 creation) four baronets, extinct 1935

See also
 Domville baronets
 Poë-Domvile baronets